The Barbados women's cricket team is the women's representative cricket team of the country of Barbados. They compete in the Women's Super50 Cup and the Twenty20 Blaze. They have won four Super50 Cup titles and two Twenty20 Blaze titles.

In 2022, the team competed at the Commonwealth Games, playing three Twenty20 Internationals.

History
Barbados joined the West Indies domestic structure for its inaugural season in 1975–76, playing in the Federation Championships. They managed one victory that season, beating Grenada by an innings and 83 runs. The following season, 1977, they again won one match and finished 3rd out of 5 teams. Barbados only played in one further season, 1980, before ending their participation in the domestic structure until 2004.

In their return season, 2004, they finished 4th in the league competition of the Federation Championships, as well as reaching the semi-finals of the knockout competition.

In 2013, Barbados reached the final of the second edition of the Twenty20 Blaze, but lost to Jamaica. 2015 saw Barbados win their first 50-over title, topping the league stage of the Regional Championship before beating Jamaica in the final. After finishing as runners-up in the 50-over competition in 2016 and 2016–17, Barbados dominated the next two seasons, winning both competitions in both years. The side went unbeaten throughout the whole 2018–19 season, with Barbadians Deandra Dottin and Hayley Matthews the leading run-scorer and the leading wicket-taker, respectively, in both competitions. They finished second in the 2022 Twenty20 Blaze, losing out to Jamaica on Net Run Rate, before beating Jamaica in the final of the 2022 Women's Super50 Cup to win their fourth one-day title.

In 2022, Barbados competed at the Commonwealth Games, representing the West Indies as the most recent winner of the Twenty20 Blaze at the time. All matches they played had Twenty20 International status, as stated by the ICC. Barbados won their first match of the tournament, beating Pakistan by 15 runs, before losing to Australia and India to finish third in their group.

Players

Current squad
Based on squad announced for the 2022 domestic season and the 2022 Commonwealth Games. Players in bold have international caps.

Notable players
Players who have played for Barbados and played internationally are listed below, in order of first international appearance (given in brackets). Players listed with a Barbados flag appeared for the side at the 2022 Commonwealth Games, which carried Twenty20 International status:

  Sheryl Bayley (1976)
  Gloria Gill (1976)
  Janet Mitchell (1976)
  Patricia Whittaker (1976)
  Pamela Lavine (2005)
  Deandra Dottin (2008)
  Shakera Selman (2008)
  Danielle Small (2008)
  Charlene Taitt (2008)
  Kycia Knight (2011)
  Shaquana Quintyne (2011)
  Kyshona Knight (2013)
  Shamilia Connell (2014)
  Hayley Matthews (2014)
  Aaliyah Alleyne (2019)
  Shanika Bruce (2022)
  Trishan Holder (2022)
  Alisa Scantlebury (2022)
  Aaliyah Williams (2022)
  Keila Elliott (2022)
  Shaunte Carrington (2022)

Honours
 Women's Super50 Cup:
 Winners (4): 2015, 2018, 2018–19, 2022
 Twenty20 Blaze:
 Winners (2): 2018, 2018–19

Records

Twenty20 Internationals
Highest team total: 144/4, vs Pakistan, 29 July 2022 at Edgbaston Cricket Ground, Birmingham.
Highest individual innings: 62*, Kycia Knight vs Pakistan, 29 July 2022 at Edgbaston Cricket Ground, Birmingham.
Best bowling figures in an innings: 1/7, Shanika Bruce vs Australia, 31 July 2022 at Edgbaston Cricket Ground, Birmingham.

T20I record versus other nations
Records complete to WT20I #1187. Last updated 4 August 2022.

See also
 Barbados national cricket team
 Barbados Royals (WCPL)

References

Cricket
Women's national cricket teams
Women's cricket in Barbados
Women's cricket teams in the West Indies